Cheshmeh Jan Qoli (also Romanized as Cheshmeh Jān Qolī and Chashmeh-ye Jānqolī, Cheshmeh Jānqolī, and Cheshmeh-ye Jānqolī; also known as Cheshmeh Khānqolī, Ganj-i-Quli, Kānī-ye Jānqolī, and Kanj-e Kūlī) is a village in Howmeh Rural District, in the Central District of Bijar County, Kurdistan Province, Iran. At the 2006 census, its population was 105, in 28 families. The village is populated by Kurds.

References 

Towns and villages in Bijar County
Kurdish settlements in Kurdistan Province